Toyoshige is a masculine Japanese given name.

Possible writings
Toyoshige can be written using different combinations of kanji characters. Here are some examples:

豊重, "bountiful, heavy"
豊茂, "bountiful, luxuriant"
豊繁, "bountiful, prosperous/complexity"
登代重, "climb up, generation, heavy"

The name can also be written in hiragana とよしげ or katakana トヨシゲ.

Notable people with the name
 Utagawa Toyoshige (歌川 豊重, 1777–1835) a Japanese ukiyo-e artist also known as Toyokuni II (二代目 歌川 豊国).
, a Japanese daimyō.

Japanese masculine given names